Calcitroic acid (1α-hydroxy-23-carboxy-24,25,26,27-tetranorvitamin D3) is a major metabolite of 1α,25-dihydroxyvitamin D3 (calcitriol). Often synthesized in the liver and kidneys, calcitroic acid is generated in the body after vitamin D is first converted into calcitriol, an intermediate in the fortification of bone through the formation and regulation of calcium in the body. During this deactivation process, oxidation reactions at C24 and C23 occur which ultimately lead to side-chain cleavage which helps in the formation of calcitroic acid. These pathways managed by calcitriol are thought to be inactivated through its hydroxylation by the enzyme CYP24A1, also called calcitriol 24-hydroxylase. Specifically, it is thought to be the major route to inactivate vitamin D metabolites.

Hydroxylation and further metabolism of calcitriol in the liver and the kidneys yields calcitroic acid, a water soluble compound that is excreted in bile.

A recent review suggested that current knowledge of calcitroic acid is limited, and more studies are needed to identify its physiological role. Calcitroic acid is fairly newly introduced in studies considering it was isolated and characterized approximately 40 years ago. This explains why current knowledge is limited on the vitamin d metabolite.

In case where a higher concentration of this acid is used in vitro, studies determined that calcitroic acid binds to vitamin D receptor (VDR) and induces gene transcription.

In vivo, studies determined that calcitroic acid, along with citrulline, may be used to quantify the amount of ionizing radiation an individual has been exposed to.

Uses and Functions 
Calcitriol is given to those who cannot produce enough active vitamin D such as those with renal diseases. Dosage intake is dependent upon the specific medical condition and the body's response to therapy.

References 

Secosteroids
Vitamin D
Indenes
Human metabolites